Fagotia wuesti is an extinct species of freshwater snail with an operculum, an aquatic gastropod mollusk in the family Melanopsidae.

References

Melanopsidae
Pleistocene gastropods
Fossil taxa described in 1990